Tengchong is a county-level city of Baoshan City, western Yunnan province, People's Republic of China.  It is well known for its volcanic activity. The city is named after the town of Tengchong which serves as its political center, previously known as Tengyue in Chinese. English language sources of the late nineteenth and early twentieth centuries use names such as Teng-Chung, Tingyueh, Teng Yueh, Momein and Momien.

Tengchong marks the southwestern terminus of the Heihe–Tengchong Line, an imaginary line significant in geography that divides the area of China into two roughly equal parts.

History

Early history
Tengchong is one of the earliest developed regions in Southwest China. During the Western Han dynasty (206 BC – AD 24), it belonged to Yizhou Commandery. In the Sui (581–618) and Tang (618–907) dynasties, a contemporary prefecture governed by a local chieftain was set up. In the Yuan dynasty (1271–1368), Tengyue Prefecture was instituted. In the following dynasties, different administrative offices were set up. In 1913, Tengchong was made a county. Historically, it occupied an important position on the Southwestern Silk Route. The Sichuan cloth and bamboo sticks available at the markets in Bactria (including Afghanistan and parts of India) were brought there from the ancient Bonan Route through Tengchong. From the Ming dynasty onwards, large numbers of Tengchong people went abroad to trade and seek a livelihood. The city grew wealthy from trade with Myanmar and South East Asia due to its proximity to Mandalay across the Burmese border.

The British

In 1868, during a visit to Tengyue, British Army Major Sladen procured a woodblock printed edition of the Chinese history of the town, which was to be brought back to England and deposited at the British Museum. In the West the town is best known as the site of the murder of British diplomat Augustus Margary on February21, 1875, an event which led to the Chefoo Convention. It was also the base of the China Inland Mission missionary James Fraser during the majority of his time working with the Lisu people. At one point British forces in British-occupied Burma established a trading post in the town with hopes of generating wealth through trade with China. In the early 20th century, a thriving cross-border trade between British-controlled Burma and China was centered around Tengchong. In 1921, construction work began on the British consulate in Tengchong, with completion 10 years later.

World War II
During World War II, the area around Tengchong was the scene of fierce battles between the Japanese, invading from occupied Burma, and the combined Chinese forces of nationalists and communists aided by American fighter squadrons. After the Chinese government relocated to Sichuan after the fall of Nanjing, there were grave concerns that if Yunnan fell, Japanese access to Sichuan would become relatively easy, forcing a new and cumbersome relocation, hence large forces were deployed to stop the Japanese army.

Geography

Situated at the southwestern end of the (transversely faulted) Hengduan Mountains, Tengchong topographically assumes the form of a horseshoe with the opening facing the south.

The crustal movement in the city is active and earthquakes are frequent. The volcanoes on Dayingshan, Shitoushan, the Greater Heikongshan, the Lesser Heikong Mountains erupted repeatedly. The city seat is surrounded by a group of young volcanoes.

As is the case for most of Yunnan, Tengchong has many different ethnicities living in and around the town. Han, Dai and Lisu are dominant but also Tibetans, Bai, Aini and people with Burmese ancestry are plentiful.

Climate
As with much of the province, Tengchong experiences a mild subtropical highland climate (Köppen Cwb). Spring begins early and remains relatively dry and sunny until May, when there is a dramatic uptick in frequency and amount of rainfall that lasts until late September. Summers are warm, rainy and generally overcast, with August, the warmest month, averaging . Autumn sees an abrupt reduction in rainfall and return to sunniness. With monthly percent possible sunshine ranging from 16% in July to 75% in December, the city receives 2,046 hours of bright sunshine annually; in summer the city is one of the least sunny locations nationally.

Administrative divisions
Tengchong county-level city administers 11 towns and seven townships.  The most notable town under Tengchong's jurisdiction is Heshun, a historical town 4 km west from Tengchong's city centre.
11 towns 

7 townships

Economy

Tengchong's industry and handicraft work were fostered during the Ming and Qing Dynasties, nearly 400 years ago. Factories and workshops were set up first by importing equipment from abroad. Earlier products included textile goods, leather, soaps, battery, cigarettes, matches, etc. They found market in West Yunnan and Burma and Southeast Asian countries. Since the founding of the People's Republic, a more complete industrial system was formed, comprising 32 departments like power generating, metallurgy, machinery, paper making, textile industry, matches production, pharmacy, tanning, chemical industry, sugar refining, tea leaves refining, food processing, etc. The major products include refined tin, pig iron, crude lead, timber, plywood, cement, refractory, diatomite filtration promoter, sulphuric acid, caustic soda, hydrochlorite potassium chlorate, calcium phdrogen phosphate, paper, canesugar, refined tea leaves, preserved fruits, edible oil, matches, Chinese medicine, etc. The matches, Chinese medicine, refined tin, refined tea leaves and the "xuanzhi" (a high quality writing paper originally produced in Xuancheng) enjoy high reputation abroad.

In agriculture, Tengchong produces grain and oil crops, tobacco, tea leaves, sugarcane, etc. The production of tobacco has a history of more than 400 years. Tengchong tobacco, cultivated on the volcanic mountain slopes is of excellent quality and therefore used as a blend. The Chuanlong tea leaves and large-sized tea leaves sell particularly well.

Tengchong is known for its jade culture and for its geothermal springs and the Lisu ethnic group. The city has actually grown into the biggest processing and trade center of jadeite in Southeast Asia. While you can find some craftsmen processing jadeite at the huge jadeite market, to get a taste of the local culture, visit the Hehua (Lotus Flower) Township near the city, where there are craftsmen processing jadeite at the huge jadeite market. Du Maosheng is the chairman of the Tengchong Jewelry and Jade Association.

In recent years, Tengchong has become a centre of imported Burmese amber, which is largely smuggled over the border from Myanmar. It is estimated that around 100 tonnes passed through to Tengchong in 2015, with an estimated value between five and seven billion yuan. Burmese amber was estimated to make up 30% of Tenchong's gemstone market (the rest being jade), and was declared one of the cities eight main industries by the local government. The highest valued amber colour is deep red, referred to as 血珀 (Blood amber). Tengchong's Jade and Amber Bazaar takes place every fifth day and attracts many dealers, Burmese traders, tourists and locals.

Natural resources
The city abounds in geothermal energy. There are over 80 steaming fountain hot streams and boiling fountains. Ten of them spout hot water of 90 C and upward. Natural resources are plentiful. There are over 2,000 higher plants. Among the economic and timber forests, there are forests of oil tea, catalpa, common China-fir, Armandi pine, walnut. The percentage of forest cover reaches 34.6% of the city. Ornamental and medicinal plants exist in great quantities. The blossoms of the rhododendrons on Gaoligongshan Mountain are exceptionally large. The Gaoligong Nature Reserve, renowned as a natural botanical garden, has over 1,400 species of higher plants, many rare and precious animals and medicinal plants. The area is the origin of R. giganteum forest at Tagg (a special rhododendron species) and Yunnan camellia.

Mineral resources include iron, tin, lead, zinc, wolfram, uranium, diatomite, rock crystal. Wollastonite, lignite, and others.

The city also possess hydroelectric plants including Sujiahekou Hydropower Station.

Transport

Bus and flights are both available to and from Kunming. There are daily buses to Dali, Ruili, Manche and Xishuangbanna. Daily flights to Chengdu in Sichuan as well as several daily flights from Beijing (stop-over in Kunming) have begun since the new airport opened.

Airport

Tengchong Tuofeng Airport went into service in early 2009. The airport is located at Tuofeng village, 12 kilometers from Tengchong.  In memory of the Hump Route, an air route which contributed much to the victory in the west Yunnan campaign during the war against Japan, Tengchong airport is named Hump Airport. The road to the airport is named the "Flying Tigers Road" in memory of the American pilots who flew the route. The total investment in the airport is to be around RMB430 million ($54.69 million). The major investors of the project are the Yunnan Airports Group, Yunnan Guangfang Group and Tengchong government who will contribute at a proportion 46 percent, 40 percent and 10 percent respectively. The airport itself is located on a mountain plateau surrounded by peaks. Takeoffs and landings offer extensive views but can be quite unnerving.

Tourism

For 2005, the city received 3.3 million tourists, with the majority of them visitors from within the province.

Various traditional villages around the town have been developed as tourist attractions.  The town of Heshun features impressive architecture that was built with wealth from multi-generational trading families who sent children to Burma.  The village contains a small museum dedicated to Ai Siqi, the early communist philosopher. It is based in his former house where he lived for two years. It contains pictures, personal items and a statue of him in the yard of the compound.

A large but seasonal fresh water wetland to the north attracts bird-watchers and nature-lovers, and tourists also visit a commercially developed volcanic park to the south. The recently constructed airport has brought an increase in domestic tourism. Routes to Sichuan and Beijing (over Kunming) have proved popular and the city predicts double the amount of annual visitors over the next five years. Several golf courses are in the planning stages and at least one is currently open for business, a 54-hole course located five kilometers outside of town. Several massive real estate projects are under construction aimed at selling second homes to domestic visitors. A little further from Tengchong you can visit "The Temple in the Sky" located high on a mountain which on perfect days will have a cloud cover located below it.

The southern parts of the Gaoligong Mountain range is found at the eastern outskirts of Tengchong. It is a UNESCO World Heritage Site as a part of the Three Parallel Rivers of Yunnan Protected Areas, established in 2003.

Conservation Carbon Project
The Conservation Carbon Project was set up by Conservation International, Nature Conservancy and Yunnan Forestry Department to restore forests and create sustainable livelihoods in the city.

See also
Chinese jade
Gaoligong Mountain
Heihe-Tengchong Line
Margary Affair
Three Parallel Rivers of Yunnan Protected Areas – Unesco World Heritage Site

References

Beyond the Wall, China Daily 2008-10-06

Further reading

External links
Tengchong Official Website
Tengchong Tourism Bureau

Official Website for Heshun Town

 
County-level divisions of Baoshan, Yunnan
Cities in Yunnan